William Henry Harrison Stowell (July 26, 1840 – April 27, 1922) was a 19th-century congressman, merchant and industrialist from Virginia, Vermont, Massachusetts, Wisconsin and Minnesota.

Biography
Born in Windsor, Vermont, Stowell attended public schools in Boston, Massachusetts, as a child and graduated from Boston Latin School in 1860. He engaged in mercantile pursuits before moving to Virginia in 1865 and became collector of internal revenue for the fourth district in 1869. Stowell was elected a Republican to the United States House of Representatives in 1870, serving from 1871 to 1877 and was a delegate to the Republican National Convention in 1876. He moved to Appleton, Wisconsin, in 1880 and engaged in paper manufacturing and later moved to Duluth, Minnesota, in 1886 and engaging in paper and steel manufacturing. Stowell was president of the Manufacturers Bank of West Duluth from 1889 to 1895 and was a correspondent in Paris, France, for various newspapers. He moved to Amherst, Massachusetts in 1914, where he died on April 27, 1922. Stowell was interred in Woodlawn Cemetery in New York City.

Electoral history

1870; Stowell was elected to the U.S. House of Representatives unopposed.
1872; Stowell was re-elected with 65.61% of the vote, defeating Conservative Phillip Watkins McKinney.
1874; Stowell was re-elected with 63.9% of the vote, defeating Democrat William Hodges Mann and Independent C.H. Porter.

References

External links

1840 births
1922 deaths
American bank presidents
American Episcopalians
People from Windsor, Vermont
Politicians from Amherst, Massachusetts
Politicians from Appleton, Wisconsin
Politicians from Duluth, Minnesota
Burials at Woodlawn Cemetery (Bronx, New York)
Boston Latin School alumni
Republican Party members of the United States House of Representatives from Virginia
Wisconsin Republicans
Minnesota Republicans
Massachusetts Republicans
19th-century American politicians